is a passenger railway station located in the city of Ōtsu, Shiga Prefecture, Japan, operated by the private railway company Keihan Electric Railway.

Lines

Station layout
The station consists of two opposed unnumbered side platforms connected by a level crossing. The station is unattended.

Platforms

Adjacent stations

History
The station was relocated 300 meters towards Sakamoto on September 24, 1967 due to the relocation of the Otsu City Hall. The station name was changed it its present name on March 17, 2018.

Passenger statistics
In fiscal 2018, the station was used by an average of 1334 passengers daily (boarding passengers only).

Surrounding area
 Otsu City Hall
 Otsu City Public Enterprise Bureau
 Otsu City Hall Post Office
 Otsu City Fire Department 
 Shiga Prefectural Police Academy
 Shiga Prefectural Otsu Commercial High School

See also
List of railway stations in Japan

References

External links

Keihan official home page

Railway stations in Shiga Prefecture
Stations of Keihan Electric Railway
Railway stations in Japan opened in 1927
Railway stations in Ōtsu